Serine protease 55 is a protein that in humans is encoded by the PRSS55 gene.

Function

This gene encodes a member of a group of membrane-anchored chymotrypsin (S1)-like serine proteases. The encoded protein is primarily expressed in the Leydig and Sertoli cells of the testis and may be involved in male fertility. Alternate splicing results in multiple transcript variants. [provided by RefSeq, Sep 2010].

References

Further reading